Kenneth R. R. Gros Louis (December 18, 1936 – October 20, 2017) was a university official and English professor at Indiana University Bloomington. Born in New Hampshire, he attended Phillips Exeter Academy and Columbia University, graduating in 1959. In 1964 he was awarded a PhD in English and comparative literature at the University of Wisconsin–Madison. His research dealt with medieval and Renaissance literature. His teaching methods were brought together in Literary Interpretations of Biblical Narratives, which appeared in 21 editions published by Abingdon Press between 1974 and 1982.

He became an assistant professor in the departments of English and Comparative Literature in 1964 and taught courses on Shakespeare and medieval literature. He chaired the English department, 1973–1978, and served as Dean of the College of Arts and Sciences from 1978 to 1980. He was the campus executive officer as Vice President of the Bloomington campus from 1980 to 1988 and as Vice President of Indiana University and Chancellor of the Bloomington campus from 1988 to 2001. He retired in 2001. He returned as Interim Senior Vice President for Academic Affairs and Bloomington Chancellor from 2004 to 2006. He reported to system presidents John W. Ryan, Thomas Ehrlich, Myles Brand and Adam Herbert.

The university grew rapidly in enrollment, endowment, and reputation. Gros Louis set up the Office of Gay, Lesbian & Bisexual Student Support Services in 1994, and the departments of Film, Jewish Studies and Afro-American Studies. He expanded the department of journalism into the School of Journalism.

References

Further reading
 Costello, Becca. "Longtime IU Administrator Kenneth Gros Louis Dies at Age 80" Indiana Public Media  Oct 21, 2017
 Gros Louis, Kenneth. "Herman B Wells and the Legacy of Leadership at Indiana University." Indiana Magazine of History 103#3 (2007): 290-301. online
 Talbot, Peter. "Remembrance event tells stories of former chancellor Kenneth Gros Louis" Indiana Daily Student  (Apr 30, 2018)

1936 births
2017 deaths
Indiana University faculty
 University of Wisconsin–Madison College of Letters and Science alumni
People from Wilton, New Hampshire
Columbia College (New York) alumni
Phillips Exeter Academy alumni